The Commander of the Army is the title of the professional head of the Sri Lanka Army. The current Commander of the Army is Lt. General Vikum Liyanage.

The post traces its roots to the post of General Officer Commanding, Ceylon, which was the title of the General Officer Commanding of the British Army units in Ceylon prior to independence in 1948. After the formation of the Ceylon Army in 1949, its first commander was of the rank of Brigadier, hence the title Commander of the Ceylon Army was formally adopted although it was at times referred as General Officer Commanding, Ceylon as far as the 1960s.
   
Serving army commanders have by convention been of the rank of Lieutenant General, promoted to the honorary rank of General on retirement or after getting the appointment of Chief of Defence Staff, with the exception of Sarath Fonseka who was elevated to the rank of General while serving as Commander. Another notable figure was Denis Perera, who was promoted to full general in 2007 after 26 years of retirement.

The official residence of the commander is General's House, Colombo.

List of Commanders

References

External links
Former Army commanders
Three Service Commanders promoted

Sri Lanka Army
Sri Lanka Army appointments
Army
Sri Lanka
Lists of Sri Lankan military personnel